Banca Popolare Commercio e Industria S.p.A. (BPCI) was an Italian bank based in Milan, Lombardy. Found in 1888, the bank absorbed other banks in the 20th century, as well as forming bank group with other banks in the first decade of the 21st century. However, in late 2016 the bank was absorbed by parent company UBI Banca, becoming a defunct brand.

As of 31 December 2014 BPCI had 196 branches, 148 of them in Lombardy, followed by 27 in Emilia-Romagna, 20 in Lazio and 1 in Tuscany.

History
In 2010, Banca Popolare Commercio e Industria sold 87 branches to sister companies, as well as acquired 134 branches. Moreover, Banca Regionale Europea (BRE), formed by a merger of Lombard and Piedmontese bank (Banca del Monte di Lombardia and Cassa di Risparmio di Cuneo), retained only one branch in Lombardy. One of the minority owner of BRE, the banking foundation of Banca del Monte di Lombardia, acquired the shares of BPCI from UBI Banca, at the same time sold all the shares of BRE to UBI Banca. As of 31 December 2010 UBI Banca owned 75.077% shares of BPCI, followed by the banking foundation (16.237%) and Aviva S.p.A. (8.686%). Before the transaction, Aviva held 16.64% and the rest by UBI Banca.

Timeline
1963 Incorporated Cassa San Alessandro di Bergamo
1968 Acquired Banca Toljia
1977 Incorporated Banca Popolare di Codogno
1980 Incorporated Credito Lodigiano
1991 Incorporated Banca Popolare di Vigevano
1996 Acquired Banca Popolare di Luino e di Varese
2001 Acquired Banca Carime
2003 merged with Banca Popolare di Bergamo to form Banche Popolari Unite Group
2007 Banche Popolari Unite merged with Banca Lombarda e Piemontese to form UBI Banca
2010 Internal reorganization with Banca Regionale Europea, Banca Popolare di Bergamo and Banco di Brescia
2016 Absorbed by UBI Banca, former headquarter at 33 via Moscova sold to Sericon Investment Fund, managed by Savills Investment Management SGR

References

External links
 archive at Borsa Italiana 
 Storia (in Italian)

Banks established in 1888
Italian companies established in 1888
Banks disestablished in 2016
2016 disestablishments in Italy
Companies based in Milan
Former UBI Banca subsidiaries
Defunct cooperative banks of Italy